Robert William Crowe is an American operatic sopranist (male soprano) and musicologist.

Life and career

Crowe was born in Escondido, California. He graduated magna cum laude from Millsaps College in 1992 and received his master's degree from Boston University College of Fine Arts in 1994, followed by a Professional Studies Certificate from the Manhattan School of Music in 1995.

He made his debut as sopranist in 1992. In 1995 he sang the role of Cherubino in Mozart's Le nozze di Figaro at Des Moines Metro Opera. He was the National Winner of the Metropolitan Opera Competition in 1995. In 2017 he received his PhD in Historical Musicology from Boston University.

His repertoire extends from Renaissance to contemporary music, but he focuses on the Italian baroque opera of the 18th and early 19th century.

His recordings between the mid 1990s and 2017 are of importance for the rediscovery of the vocal music from the early Baroque to the Classical period.

Awards

1995 National Winner Metropolitan Opera National Council Auditions
1995 2nd Prize National Opera Competition
1995 Manhattan School of Music Most Promising Career in Opera
1995 Richard F. Gold Career Development Award
1998 Sullivan Foundation Grant

References

External links 
 

Sopranists
Operatic countertenors
American opera singers
Living people
Year of birth missing (living people)
Boston University College of Fine Arts alumni
Millsaps College alumni
People from Escondido, California
Singers from California
Winners of the Metropolitan Opera National Council Auditions
Classical musicians from California